Johan "Jo" van de Kieft (21 May 1884 – 22 August 1970) was a Dutch politician of the Labour Party (PvdA) and businessman.

Biography
He was a municipal councillor in Bussum.

Decorations

References

External links

Official
  J. (Jo) van de Kieft Parlement & Politiek
  J. van de Kieft (PvdA) Eerste Kamer der Staten-Generaal

 

1884 births
1970 deaths
Commanders of the Order of Orange-Nassau
Dutch accountants
Dutch nonprofit directors
Dutch expatriates in India
Dutch expatriates in Indonesia
Dutch expatriates in Sri Lanka
Grand Officiers of the Légion d'honneur
Knights of the Order of the Netherlands Lion
Labour Party (Netherlands) politicians
Members of the Senate (Netherlands)
Ministers of Finance of the Netherlands
Municipal councillors in North Holland
Politicians from Amsterdam
People from Assen
People from Bussum
Reformed Churches Christians from the Netherlands
Social Democratic Workers' Party (Netherlands) politicians
20th-century Dutch businesspeople
20th-century Dutch politicians